is a train station in Ōyodo, Yoshino District, Nara Prefecture, Japan.

Lines 
 Kintetsu Railway
 Yoshino Line

Platforms and tracks

External links
 

Railway stations in Japan opened in 1929
Railway stations in Nara Prefecture